Conwy County Borough is a county borough in Wales. It borders Gwynedd to the west and south, and Denbighshire to the east. Other settlements in the county borough include Abergele, Betws-y-Coed, Colwyn Bay, Conwy, Llandudno, Llandudno Junction, Llanfairfechan, Llanrwst, and Penmaenmawr.

Geography
The River Conwy, after which the county borough is named, lies wholly within the area: rising in Snowdonia and flowing through Llanrwst and Trefriw en route to the Irish Sea by Conwy. The river here marks the border between the historic counties of Caernarfonshire and Denbighshire.

One third of the land area of the county borough lies in the Snowdonia National Park, and the council appoint three of the 18 members of the Snowdonia National Park Authority. The eastern part includes the larger section of Denbigh Moors.

The vast majority of the population live on the coast; the only settlement of any size inland is Llanrwst.

Welsh language
According to the 2001 census 39.7% of the population of the county borough have "one or more skills" in Welsh, which ranks it 5th out of 22 principal areas in Wales.

The amount of Welsh spoken in the county borough greatly varies from location to location, with generally the least being spoken on the coastal fringe.

Examples of the percentage of people age 3+ speaking Welsh by electoral ward, as of the 2011 census :

Government

The county borough was formed on 1 April 1996 by merging the districts of Aberconwy and Colwyn when it was originally named Aberconwy and Colwyn. However, its council renamed the district a day later, on 2 April 1996 to Conwy.

Politics
Conwy is represented in the UK Parliament by Conservative Party politicians Robin Millar and David Jones, though David Jones' Clwyd West constituency also covers part of southern Denbighshire. In the Senedd, it is represented by Conservative Party politicians Janet Finch-Saunders and Darren Millar.

Coat of arms

Conwy County Borough Council was granted a coat of arms by the College of Arms in 2001. The new arms recall those of both Aberconwy and Colwyn Borough Councils. The main part of the shield depicts blue and silver waves for the river from which the county borough takes its name, and also recalls the gold and blue wavy field of Colwyn's arms. On top of the waves is placed a symbolic red tower, representing Conwy Castle. The chief or upper third of the shield is coloured green, the main colour in Aberconwy's arms. In the centre of the chief is a severed head from the heraldry of Marchudd ap Cynan, Lord of Abergele and Rhos. On either side are two black spears embrued, or having drops of blood on their points. These come from the reputed arms of Nefydd Hardd, associated with the Nant Conwy area. In front of each spear is a golden garb or wheatsheaf, for the rural areas of the county borough.

Above the shield, placed on the steel helm usual to British civic arms, is the crest. This takes the form of the Welsh red dragon supporting a Bible, rising from a wreath of oak leaves and acorns. The representation of the Bible is to commemorate the fact that the first Welsh language translation of the book originated in the area, while the oak circlet recalls that an oak tree formed the main charge in the arms of Colwyn Borough Council, and its predecessor the municipal borough of Colwyn Bay.

The motto adopted is "Tegwch i Bawb", meaning "Fairness to All".

See also
List of places in Conwy County Borough for a list of towns and villages
List of churches in Conwy
List of schools in Conwy

References

External links

 
Principal areas of Wales
County boroughs of Wales